A Chief Innovation Officer (CINO) or Chief Technology Innovation Officer (CTIO) is a person in a company who is primarily responsible for managing the process of innovation and change management in an organization, as well as being in some cases the person who "originates new ideas but also recognizes innovative ideas generated by other people".  The CINO also manages technological change.

Overview
The term "chief innovation officer" was first coined and described in the 1998 book Fourth Generation R&D. Organizations with a CINO/CTIO are practicing part of the fourth generation of innovation theory and practice to emerge since 1900.
Successful chief innovation officers focus on delivering on the key principles behind innovation - leadership, creating networks, harnessing VOC/HOC in idea development, leveraging the right incentives, and building/running an effective, transparent, and efficient innovation process.

The CINO is responsible for managing the innovation process inside the organization that identifies strategies, business opportunities and new technologies and then develops new capabilities and architectures with partners, new business models and new industry structures to serve those opportunities.

CINO/CTIO does not have to report to the CEO or another C-level executive. However, for such role to succeed it requires organisational support from the highest level possible and reporting to the CEO or one of its direct reports is a common practice. CINO/CTIO is a functional title, similar to the chief information security officer. The words "chief" and "officer" are used to communicate that a person in this position is responsible for driving innovation throughout the entire organization. Using a functional "chief ... officer" title helps to communicate that this is a cross-organizational position and enables this person to work across organizational silos.

The CINO/CTIO focuses on radical or breakthrough innovation. The coined term CINO/CTIO is used to differentiate the position from the chief information officer, who is responsible for the information technology and computer systems that support enterprise goals.

Chief technology innovation officer
A chief technology innovation officer (CTIO) is focused on the organizational innovation through technology. This is an important strategic position especially in an organization that has significant technology component in addition to the traditional information technology. This position is typically held by a person with a broad technical expertise in that organization's industry.

The title chief technology innovation officer is commonly used in the organizations that have a technology component as a part of its core business. The CTIO is responsible for maintaining organizational technological strategy, defining the requirements for new technology implementations and communicating them to key business stakeholders.

The CTIO is responsible for organizational leadership on technology issues, management of the technology research and review function, ensuring the alignment of technology vision with business strategy, and for driving technology innovation throughout the entire organization. The position can also be responsible for tracking new technology developments in areas of interest to the organization to ensure that it maintains a technological edge within the industry, analyzing and improving upon technology standards and maintaining organizational awareness of new technologies.

See also
Chief information officer (CIO)
Chief technology officer (CTO)

References

Business occupations
Corporate governance
Management occupations